Police Major General Surapong Ariyamongkol (born 6 January 1946) is a Thai sprinter and coach. He competed in the men's 4 × 100 metres relay at the 1972 Summer Olympics, and is Secretary-General of the Athletic Association of Thailand and manager of the Thai national athletics team. He is the elder twin brother of Supanat Ariyamongkol.

References

External links
 

1946 births
Living people
Athletes (track and field) at the 1972 Summer Olympics
Surapong Ariyamongkol
Surapong Ariyamongkol
Place of birth missing (living people)
Twin sportspeople